The 2010 season was the Kansas City Chiefs' 41st in the National Football League (NFL), their 51st overall and their second under the head coach/general manager tandem of Todd Haley and Scott Pioli. The team improved on its 4–12 record from 2009, won their first AFC West division title since 2003, and made the playoffs for the first time since 2006. In 2010, the Chiefs moved training camp to Missouri Western State University in St. Joseph, Missouri after spending the previous 19 summers in River Falls, Wisconsin.

Offseason

Coaching changes
The Chiefs added former Notre Dame head coach Charlie Weis as their offensive coordinator, and former Cleveland Browns head coach Romeo Crennel as their defensive coordinator. Both worked in their respective positions while Scott Pioli was the Vice President of Player Personnel with the New England Patriots. They also brought in former Arizona Cardinals coach Richie Anderson to be the team's wide receivers coach, former Notre Dame coach Bernie Parmalee to be the team's tight ends coach, former New England Patriots defensive lineman Anthony Pleasant to be the team's defensive line coach, former Kansas City Chiefs great Emmitt Thomas to be the team's defensive backs coach, Cincinnati Bengals' Defensive Coordinator Mike Zimmer's son Adam Zimmer to be the team's assistant linebackers coach, former New York Jets and New England Patriots defensive back Otis Smith to be the team's defensive quality control coach, and well-respected and longtime trainer Mike Clark to be the team's head strength and conditioning coach.

Free Agency

*RFA: Restricted free agent, UFA: Unrestricted free agent, ERFA: Exclusive rights free agent, Franchise: Franchise tag

2010 NFL Draft
The Chiefs had the fifth pick in the draft after finishing the 2009 season 4–12. They had an additional second round pick from the Atlanta Falcons in a trade that sent tight end Tony Gonzalez to the Falcons and two additional fifth round picks, one of them coming from the Carolina Panthers in a trade that sent defensive end Tank Tyler to the Panthers, and the other coming from the Miami Dolphins in exchange for quarterback Tyler Thigpen. The Chiefs traded their sixth round pick to the Dolphins for Guard Andy Alleman and tackle Ikechuku Ndukwe and their seventh round pick to the Dolphins for a sixth round pick in the 2009 NFL Draft.

Preseason

Regular season

Schedule

Note: Intra-division opponents are in bold text.

Game summaries

Week 1: vs. San Diego Chargers

The Chiefs began their season at home for a division rivalry match against the San Diego Chargers. In the first quarter the Chiefs trailed early as QB Philip Rivers completed a 3-yard TD pass to TE Antonio Gates. The Chiefs replied when RB Jamaal Charles made a 56-yard TD run. In the 2nd quarter the Chiefs took the lead with QB Matt Cassel completing a 2-yard TD pass to TE Tony Moeaki. This was followed by WR Dexter McCluster returning a punt 94 yards to the endzone for a touchdown. In the third quarter the Chargers cut the lead when QB Philip Rivers threw a 59-yard TD pass to WR Legedu Naanee. In the 4th quarter the Chiefs defense prevented any more scoring giving themselves a win.

With the win, the Chiefs began at 1–0.

Week 2: at Cleveland Browns

Hoping to increase their winning streak the Chiefs flew to Cleveland Browns Stadium for an AFC duel with the Browns. In the first quarter the Chiefs took the early lead when kicker Ryan Succop nailed a 35-yard field goal. The Chiefs fell behind in the 2nd quarter when RB Peyton Hillis completed a 1-yard TD run, but got back in the game when CB Brandon Flowers returned an interception 33 yards to the endzone for a touchdown. The Chiefs trailed again as QB Seneca Wallace made a 65-yard TD pass to WR Josh Cribbs. The Chiefs cut the lead in the 3rd quarter when Ryan Succop made a 26-yard field goal and then a 23-yard field goal in the fourth quarter, giving Kansas City the win.

With the win, the Chiefs improved to 2–0.

Week 3: vs. San Francisco 49ers
 

Hoping to increase their winning streak the Chiefs played at home ground for an interconference duel with the 49ers. In the 2nd quarter, the Chiefs scored first when QB Matt Cassel made a 31-yard TD pass to WR Dexter McCluster. The lead was narrowed when kicker Joe Nedney hit a 51-yard field goal. But the Chiefs started to rally with kicker Ryan Succop getting a 32-yard field goal, followed by Cassel making a 45-yard TD pass to WR Dwayne Bowe. Then Cassel made an 18-yard TD pass to TE Tony Moeaki. This was followed in the 4th quarter by RB Thomas Jones making a 3-yard TD run. After that, the Niners replied with QB Alex Smith making a 12-yard TD pass to WR Josh Morgan.

With the win, not only did Kansas City enter its bye week at 3–0, but it also marked their first 3–0 start since 2003. With losses by both the Chicago Bears and the Pittsburgh Steelers the following week, the Kansas City Chiefs are left as the last undefeated team.

Week 5: at Indianapolis Colts

Coming out of their bye week the Chiefs flew to Lucas Oil Stadium for an AFC duel with the Colts. In the first quarter the Chiefs trailed early as kicker Adam Vinatieri made a 20-yard field goal, followed by a 24-yard field goal in the second quarter. The Chiefs replied with kicker Ryan Succop nailing a 45-yard field goal. In the third quarter the Colts increased their lead with Vinatieri's 47-yard field goal, followed by Succop's 35 and 43-yard field goals to tie the game. In the fourth quarter the Chiefs trailed slightly with Vinatieri getting a 42-yard field goal. After that, the Chiefs defense was finally broken down with RB Mike Hart getting an 11-yard TD run.

With the loss, the Chiefs fell to 3–1 and it also marked the first time since 1970 where no teams start out 4–0.

Week 6: at Houston Texans

Hoping to rebound from their loss to the Colts The Chiefs flew to Reliant Stadium for an AFC duel against the Texans. In the first quarter the Chiefs took the early lead with QB Matt Cassel getting a 2-yard TD pass to OLB Mike Vrabel. The Texans responded and tied the game with QB Matt Schaub making a 5-yard TD pass to TE Joel Dreessen. The Chiefs rallied with Cassel making a 17 and a 42-yard TD pass to WR Dwayne Bowe in the 3rd quarter. The Texans replied with RB Derrick Ward getting a 38-yard TD run. Then kicker Ryan Succop made a 24-yard field goal to put the Chiefs up 24–14. In the fourth quarter the Texans closed the gap with RB Arian Foster making a 2-yard TD run, but the Chiefs tried to pull away with RB Thomas Jones getting an 11-yard TD run. However, the Texans replied and eventually snatched the win with Foster making a 1-yard TD run, and then with Schaub finding WR Andre Johnson on an 11-yard TD pass.

With the loss, the Chiefs fell to 3–2.

Week 7: vs. Jacksonville Jaguars

Hoping to break their losing streak the Chiefs played on home ground for an AFC duel against the Jaguars. In the first quarter the Chiefs took the lead as RB Jamaal Charles got a 4-yard TD run. But the Jaguars replied with kicker Josh Scobee nailing a 35-yard field goal. The Jaguars took the lead in the second quarter with QB Todd Bouman making an 18-yard TD pass to RB Maurice Jones-Drew. The lead didn't last long after RB Thomas Jones got a 1-yard TD run, but the Chiefs' lead was soon narrowed after Scobee hit an 18-yard field goal. The Chiefs scored in the third quarter with QB Matt Cassel completing a 53-yard TD pass to WR Dwayne Bowe. The Jaguars tried to come back with Bouman finding Mike Sims-Walker on a 9-yard TD pass, but the Chiefs pulled away as  ILB Derrick Johnson returned an interception 15 yards for a touchdown, followed by Cassel getting a 6-yard TD pass to Bowe, and with RB Jackie Battle making a 1-yard TD run.

With the win, the Chiefs improved to 4–2.

Week 8: vs. Buffalo Bills

Coming off their win over the Jaguars the Chiefs played on home ground for an AFC duel with the Bills. Late in the second quarter the Chiefs took the lead as QB Matt Cassel got a 1-yard TD pass to WR Dwayne Bowe. The lead was cut in the third quarter with kicker Rian Lindell making a 43-yard field goal. The Chiefs scored with kicker Ryan Succop getting a 28-yard field goal. The Bills responded and tied the game with Ryan Fitzpatrick throwing a 4-yard TD pass to WR Stevie Johnson. The game nearly ended in a tie as Chiefs kicker Ryan Succop made the game winning 35-yard field goal with 5 seconds left in overtime.

With the win, the Chiefs improved to 5–2.

Week 9: at Oakland Raiders

Coming off their win over the Bills the Chiefs flew to Oakland–Alameda County Coliseum for an AFC West division rivalry match against the Raiders. In the 2nd quarter the Chiefs took the lead as QB Matt Cassel made an 11-yard TD pass to WR Verran Tucker; followed by kicker Ryan Succop nailing a 43-yard field goal. In the 3rd quarter the lead was narrowed as WR Jacoby Ford returned a kickoff 94 yards for a touchdown. the Chiefs responded with Succop hitting a 25-yard field goal, but the Raiders replied with QB Jason Campbell throwing a 2-yard TD pass to Khalif Barnes, and with kicker Sebastian Janikowski making a 23-yard field goal. The Chiefs got the lead back after Cassel found WR Dwayne Bowe on a 20-yard TD pass, but the lead didn't last very long after Janikowski got a 41-yard field goal. The decision was made to go to overtime when Janikowski successfully hit a 33-yard field goal to give the Chiefs a loss.

With the loss, the Chiefs fell to 5–3.

Week 10: at Denver Broncos

Hoping to rebound from their loss to the Raiders the Chiefs flew to INVESCO Field at Mile High for a division rivalry match against the Broncos. In the first quarter the Chiefs immediately struggled with QB Kyle Orton making 17, 8 and 40-yard TD passes to WR Knowshon Moreno, WR Brandon Lloyd and WR Jabar Gaffney respectively. This was followed by Tim Tebow getting a 1-yard TD run, and with OLB Jason Hunter recovering a fumble and running 75 yards for a touchdown. The Chiefs tried to come back when QB Matt Cassel made a 5-yard TD pass to RB Jamaal Charles, followed by kicker Ryan Succop hitting a 40-yard field goal. The Chiefs struggled further as Tebow got a 3-yard TD pass to FB Spencer Larsen. They answered with Cassel's 15-yard TD pass to Bowe. The Broncos continued to score in the 4th quarter with Orton making a 15-yard TD pass to Lloyd. The Chiefs tried narrow the lead with Cassel making an 11 and a 22-yard TD pass to WR Chris Chambers and Dwayne Bowe respectively (With failed 2-point conversions for each), but the defense prevented their chances.

With the loss, the Chiefs fell to 5–4.

Week 11: vs. Arizona Cardinals

Hoping to break their two-game losing streak the Chiefs played on home ground for an inter-conference duel with the Cardinals. The Chiefs trailed early with kicker Jay Feely hitting a 36-yard field goal, but they took the lead with QB Matt Cassel completing a 1-yard TD pass to WR Dwayne Bowe. This was followed by RB Thomas Jones getting a 1 and a 3-yard TD run. The Cardinals responded with Feely making a 29-yard field goal, but the Chiefs increased their lead with kicker Ryan Succop getting a 23-yard field goal, followed by Cassel throwing a 38-yard TD pass to Bowe. The lead was narrowed when QB Derek Anderson got a 3-yard TD pass to WR Larry Fitzgerald.

With the win, the Chiefs improved to 6–4.

Week 12: at Seattle Seahawks

Coming off their win over the Cardinals the Chiefs flew to Qwest Field where they played their old division rival, the Seattle Seahawks.  In the first quarter, the Chiefs took the lead with QB Matt Cassel getting a 7-yard TD pass to WR Dwayne Bowe.  They had a problem maintaining this lead as Dustin Colquitt's punt was blocked and returned 10 yards for a touchdown by FS Earl Thomas.  They soon got the lead back as Shaun Smith got a 1-yard TD run, followed by Cassel finding Bowe again on a 36-yard TD pass.  The lead was narrowed when kicker Olindo Mare got a 43-yard field goal, followed by QB Matt Hasselbeck getting a 13-yard TD pass to TE Chris Baker. The Chiefs pulled ahead with RB Jamaal Charles getting a 3-yard TD run, followed by Cassel throwing to Bowe on a 9-yard TD pass.  The Seahawks responded as Hasselbeck completed an 87-yard TD pass to WR Ben Obomanu, but the Chiefs increased their lead as Cassel got a 6-yard TD pass to TE Tony Moeaki.

With the win, the Chiefs improved to 7–4.

Week 13: vs. Denver Broncos

Coming off their win over the Seahawks the Chiefs played on home ground for an AFC West rivalry rematch against the Broncos. 
The Chiefs took the early lead as QB Matt Cassel got a 2-yard TD pass to TE Leonard Pope. The Broncos replied with kicker Matt Prater getting a 25-yard field goal, but the Chiefs increased their lead with kicker Ryan Succop nailing a 47-yard field goal. The lead was narrowed when Prater nailed a 41-yard field goal.

With the win, the Chiefs improved to 8–4.

Week 14: at San Diego Chargers

Hoping to make it 4-straight the Chiefs flew to Qualcomm Stadium for a division rivalry rematch against the Chargers. The Chiefs trailed with QB Philip Rivers throwing a 17-yard TD pass to WR Malcolm Floyd, followed by FB Mike Tolbert getting an 8-yard TD run. The lead was increased with Rivers finding Floyd again on a 9-yard TD pass. This was followed in the fourth quarter by kicker Nate Kaeding nailing a 48-yard field goal, and then by RB Ryan Mathews getting a 15-yard TD run.

With the loss, the Chiefs fell to 8–5.

Week 15: at St. Louis Rams

After their embarrassing loss to the Chargers the Chiefs flew to Edward Jones Dome for an interconference duel against the Rams. In the first quarter the Chiefs trailed early as kicker Josh Brown nailed a 37 and a 52-yard field goal. They took the lead with QB Matt Cassel throwing a 2-yard TD pass to TE Leonard Pope, which was extended with RB Jamaal Charles getting a 2-yard TD run, followed by kicker Ryan Succop making a 53 and a 38-yard field goal. The lead was narrowed when RB Steven Jackson got a 5-yard TD run, but the Chiefs pulled away with RB Thomas Jones getting a 2-yard TD run.

With the win, the Chiefs improved to 9–5.

Week 16: vs. Tennessee Titans

Coming off their win over the Rams the Chiefs played on home ground for an AFC duel with the Titans.  The Chiefs took the early lead as QB Matt Cassel threw 14- and 5-yard TD passes to RB Jamaal Charles.  This was followed by kicker Ryan Succop nailing a 35-yard field goal, then with Cassel making a 75-yard TD pass to WR Dwayne Bowe.  The Titans responded as QB Kerry Collins got a 53-yard TD pass to WR Kenny Britt, but the Chiefs extended their lead with SS Eric Berry returning an interception 54 yards for a touchdown.  This was followed by Succop making a 42-yard field goal.  The Titans tried to come back, but only came away with Collins completing a 22-yard TD pass to TE Jared Cook.  The defense controlled the fourth quarter, giving the Chiefs the win.

Kansas City improved to 10–5 with the win, matching its win total over the previous three seasons combined. Later in the day, the Chiefs clinched their sixth AFC West division title when San Diego lost at Cincinnati.

Week 17: vs. Oakland Raiders

The Chiefs' sixteenth game was an AFC West rivalry rematch against the Raiders. They took the lead as kicker Ryan Succop nailed a 30-yard field goal, but fell behind with QB Jason Campbell completing a 5-yard TD pass to WR Chaz Schilens, followed by kicker Sebastian Janikowski hitting a 38-yard field goal. The Chiefs tied the game with RB Jamaal Charles getting a 5-yard TD run, but struggled again with RB Michael Bush getting a 26-yard TD run, followed by Jacoby Ford getting a 10-yard TD run, then with CB Stanford Routt returning an interception 22 yards for a touchdown.

With the loss, the Chiefs finish their season on a 10–6 record.

Postseason

Schedule

Game summaries

AFC Wild Card Playoffs: vs. (5) Baltimore Ravens

Entering the postseason as the AFC's #4 seed, the Chiefs began their playoff run at home in the AFC Wild Card Round against the #5 Baltimore Ravens.  Kansas City trailed early as Ravens kicker Billy Cundiff got a 19-yard field goal, yet Kansas City answered with a 41-yard touchdown run from running back Jamaal Charles.  Baltimore struck back in the second quarter as quarterback Joe Flacco completed a 9-yard touchdown pass to running back Ray Rice.

The Ravens added onto their lead in the third quarter as Cundiff made a pair of 29-yard field goals.  Afterwards, Baltimore closed out the game in the fourth quarter with running back Willis McGahee getting a 25-yard touchdown run.

With the loss, not only did the Chiefs' season come to an end with an overall record of 10–7, but they also lost their NFL worst 7th straight postseason game. This would later be matched when the Detroit Lions lost their 7th straight postseason game to the New Orleans Saints during the 2011 NFL season.

Standings

Division

Conference

Roster

Staff

Notes and references

Kansas City
AFC West championship seasons
Kansas City Chiefs seasons
2010 in sports in Missouri